Szendrei is a Hungarian surname. Notable people with the name include:

Ágnes Szendrei, Hungarian-American mathematician
Alfred Szendrei (1884–1976), American musician and musicologist, husband of Eugenie
Eugenie Szendrei (1884–1955), Austrian-Hungarian-American opera singer, wife of Alfred
József Szendrei (born 1954), Hungarian footballer
Mária Szendrei, head of Algebra and Number Theory at the János Bolyai Mathematical Institute
Norbert Szendrei (born 2000), Hungarian footballer
Sándor Szendrei, record-holder in the Budapest Marathon
Tibor Szendrei, founder of Hungarian newspaper Budapest Week